|}

The National Stakes is a Listed flat horse race in Great Britain open to horses aged two years old.
It is run at Sandown Park over a distance of 5 furlongs and 10 yards, and it is scheduled to take place each year at the end of May.

The race was first run in 1889 and was known as the National Breeders' Produce Stakes until 1959.  In 1932 it was "the most valuable two-year-old race on the English calendar".

Previous winners include Pretty Polly (1903), Cicero (1904), Neil Gow (1909), The Tetrarch (1913), Tetratema (1919), Tiffin (1928), Myrobella (1932), Tudor Minstrel (1946) and Belle of All (1950).

Winners since 1975

Earlier winners

 1889: Rathbeal
 1890: Tittle Tattle
 1891: Lady Caroline
 1892: Tibble Shiels
 1893: Delphos
 1894: Saintly
 1895: Elmsworth
 1896: Chelandry
 1900: Star Shoot / Ian
 1901: Game Chick
 1902: Rabelais
 1903: Pretty Polly
 1904: Cicero
 1905: Sarcelle
 1906: Traquair
 1907: White Eagle
 1908: Bayardo
 1909: Neil Gow
 1910: Celllni
 1911: Mountain Mint
 1912: Prue
 1913: The Tetrarch
 1914: Redfern
 1915–18: no race
 1919: Tetratema
 1920: Polly Flinders
 1921: Polyhistor
 1922: Town Guard
 1923: Mumtaz Mahal
 1924: Garden of Allah
 1925: Kate Coventry
 1926: Priscilla
 1927: Flamingo
 1928: Tiffin
 1929: Queen of the Nore
 1930: Thyestes
 1931: Orwell
 1932: Myrobella 
 1933: Colombo
 1934: Bahram
 1955: Wyndham
 1956: Full Sail
 1937: Portmarnock
 1938: Rogerstone Castle
 1939: Stardust
 1940–45: no race
 1946: Tudor Minstrel 
 1947: The Cobbler
 1948: Abernant
 1949: Palestine
 1950: Belle of All
 1951: Constantia
 1952: Bebe Grande
 1953: Tudor Honey
 1954: Courageous
 1955: Rustam
 1956: Military Law
 1957: Promulgation
 1958: Captain Kidd
 1959: Sing Sing
 1960: Kerrabee
 1961: Display
 1962: Whistling Wind
 1963: Pourparler
 1964: Double Jump
 1965: Zahedan
 1966: Falcon
 1967: Sovereign
 1968: Tower Walk
 1969: Quarryknowe
 1970: Trasi Girl
 1971: Stilvi
 1972: Hunters Path
 1973: Daring Boy 
 1974: Streak

1948 Race Abernant v Star King 

Abernant was the a dominant sprinter who went on to achieve champion status in 1949 and 1950. As a two-year-old in 1948 he was top of the Free Handicap. Abernant was only once on the stretch and that was in a fantastic race for the National Breeders Produce Stakes at Sandown on July 17. His main opponent was Star King. The 1948 edition of The Bloodstock Breeders Review provided the following wonderful account written by James Park of the race.

"Star King had won three races in runaway fashion. He had not been engaged at Ascot... Star King's jockey Sam Wragg after a gallop said "Abernant may be a good one, but he will have to hop along". I should say there was something more than quiet confidence behind Star King. Each had earned the maximum penalty and were meeting at level weights.When the tapes went up off went Star King. Abernant followed at an interval of perhaps three lengths. The others dribbled out of the gate, so that by the time half a furlong had been covered there were many lengths between Star King and the hindmost member of the party. The uphill course at Sandown is not one on which waiting tactics can be employed successfully. So I was rather surprised when Gordon Richards (Abernant's jockey) pretty well sat on Star King's tail without making any attempt to join issue. The leader was slipping along while still on the bit. Gordon, on Abernant, had what is known as a double handful. It was after covering three furlongs that Gordon set Abernant alight. He soon went past Star King and it looked all over bar the shouting. But drama was to follow. Star King had never even been shown the whip in previous races. It had not been necessary. It electrified him to such an extent he suddenly became jet propelled. By that time Abernant had gained probably a length lead. Quick to sense the situation, out came Gordon's whip. The response was not quite the same. Instead of gaining further ground, Abernant began to edge over to the right. Star King kept a perfectly true line. Up he crept, and 100 yards from the winning post he was still gaining. It was anybody's race as they went past the post, with Star King definitely going the stronger. The judge promptly ruled that Abernant had retained sufficient of his lead to win by the shortest of short heads. (There was no photo finish at Sandown at the time) James Park went on to write I am old enough to know better than to argue with the judge. He is the one person in a position to give an opinion. Sam Wragg thought he had won and he was not the only one.  

Mr Wilfred Harvey, the owner of Star King, took it well. "I hope they can meet again over 6 furlongs" he said. They did not do so. The controversy raged throughout the season, and no doubt continued during the winter. There was the usual inquest. Noel Murless ... told me that in home gallops Abernant had been ridden from behind, and had always produced a brilliant burst of speed in the last 100 yards or so. That was why it was decided to adopt similar tactics at Sandown.

In the Free Handicap at the end of the year Abernant was allocated 9st 7lb and Star King was second on the list at 9st 5lb. Timeform, in its first Annual that rated all horses, gave Abernant 133 and Star King 131 rating.

See also 
 Horse racing in Great Britain
 List of British flat horse races

References

 Paris-Turf:
Racing Post:

 

Flat races in Great Britain
Sandown Park Racecourse
Flat horse races for two-year-olds